New York, Ontario & Western Railway Company Middletown Station, also known as the O&W Station, is an historic train station located at Middletown in Orange County, New York. It was designed by Bradford Lee Gilbert and built in 1892-1893 by the New York, Ontario and Western Railway. It is a three-story Richardsonian Romanesque-style pressed brick and sandstone building. Additions and alterations were made to the original building in 1904 and 1920, designed by Middletown architect David H. Canfield. Also on the property is the contributing two-story records storage building, built in 1915. The station closed on September 10, 1953, on the cessation of O&W passenger service. 

It was listed on the National Register of Historic Places in 2014, three years after the city, which owned it at the time, sold it for $1 to the Middletown Community Health Center (MCHC), which intended to redevelop it for its uses. But financial problems with the MCHC prevented it from raising the estimated $20 million cost of the project,  despite winning some state grants. Those issues led to MCHC being bought-out by another health care organization; in 2017, it began negotiating to return it to the city. While Mayor Joe DeStefano says the city is open to offers, it is likely that the building will be demolished.

References

Railway stations on the National Register of Historic Places in New York (state)
Richardsonian Romanesque architecture in New York (state)
Buildings and structures completed in 1893
Railway stations in Orange County, New York
National Register of Historic Places in Orange County, New York
1893 establishments in New York (state)
Railway stations in the United States  opened in 1893
Former railway stations in New York (state)
Former New York, Ontario and Western Railway stations
Railway stations closed in 1957